Those marked in bold have now been capped at full International level.

Group A

Head coach:  Jyrki Heliskoski

Head coach:  Liu Chunming

Head coach:  Humberto Grondona

Head coach:  Eduardo Lara

Group B

Head coach:  Hugo Tocalli

Head coach:  Ange Postecoglou

Head coach:  Gerardo Manuel Ureña

Head coach:  Augustine Eguavoen

Group C

Head coach:  Amen Al-Sunaini

Head coach:  Antonio Violante

Head coach:  Anatole Abee

Head coach:  Marcos Paquetá

Group D

Head coach:  Yoon Deok-yeo

Head coach:  John Ellinger

Head coach:  Juan Santisteban

Head coach:  Musa Kallon

Notes

Fifa U-17 World Championship Squads, 2003
FIFA U-17 World Cup squads